Takyeh (also Romanized as Takieh; also known as Takīyeh-e Chahār Gonbad, Takyeh Chahār Gonbad, Takyeh-ye Chahār Gonbad, and Tekyeh Chahār Gonbad) is a village in Chahar Gonbad Rural District, in the Central District of Sirjan County, Kerman Province, Iran. At the 2006 census, its population was 199, in 60 families.

References 

Populated places in Sirjan County